Ypadú or ypadu (also known as mambe) is an unrefined, unconcentrated powder made from toasted coca leaves and the ash of various other plants. It is traditionally prepared and consumed by indigenous tribes in the Northwest Amazon. Like coca teas consumed in Peru to adapt to sickness induced by high elevation, it has a long ethnobotanical history and cultural associations.

Background 
A report by Pien Metaal and others written for the Transnational Institute ("Coca yes, cocaine no?", p. 19) states that:

Contemporary development of an ancient tradition 
Foreign visitors to some Latin American countries have demonstrated an interest in commercial and cultural uses of the stimulant properties of the coca plant, which are less harmful than cocaine which is highly and unnaturally refined. A few websites depict a mild modern preparation of the powdery ypadu mixture using plastic jars and coffee grinders or food processors rather than the traditional implements such as clay vessels and mortar-and-pestles fashioned from wood. Peruvian coca of the species Erythroxylum coca has reportedly been used in this adaptation to produce effective mixtures with pleasant taste.

Support for the use of Ypadu 
Proponents of coca recommend mass production of ypadu as a harmless replacement for heavily refined and concentrated cocaine. They argue that a mild alternative to cocaine would cut into the illicit drug trade and the costs it imposes on societies.

References

External links
 https://web.archive.org/web/20070207042344/http://www.tni.org/reports/drugs/debate13.pdf (PDF)

Preparations of coca